Paulino Meléndres (born 1927) was a Filipino boxer. He competed in the men's featherweight event at the 1956 Summer Olympics. At the 1956 Summer Olympics, he lost to Bernard Schröter of East Germany.

References

External links
  

1927 births
Possibly living people
Filipino male boxers
Olympic boxers of the Philippines
Boxers at the 1956 Summer Olympics
Place of birth missing
Featherweight boxers